Inga Tavdishvili (born July 20, 1982 in Rustavi) is a Georgian rhythmic gymnast.

Tavdishvili competed for Georgia in the rhythmic gymnastics individual all-around competition at the 2000 Summer Olympics in Sydney. There she was 21st in the qualification round and did not advance to the final.

References

External links 
 
 

1982 births
Living people
Rhythmic gymnasts from Georgia (country)
Gymnasts at the 2000 Summer Olympics
Olympic gymnasts of Georgia (country)
People from Rustavi